Naria Girls known in Japan as  is a Japanese anime television series produced by Bouncy studio. The series is marketed as a "user participation" anime by its producers. The name of the series makes use of a pun; "Nariagaru" which means "rising in the world".

Plot
Urara, Hanabi, and Inaho aim to become popular throughout Japan by rendering themselves in the anime medium. They decide that the theme of their anime would be magical girls in order to appeal to a wide demographic; from children to adults. The three broadcast their one-cour magical girl anime to the public.

Character

Production
Naria Girls was produced by the Bouncy, an animation studio, with the use of Kigurumi Live Animator KiLA, a real-time live animation software. The software was used to animate the CGI-rendered characters real-time through motion capture. Okazu Misoyama was responsible for the character design of the series.

Media

Anime
Naria Girls premiered in Japan on July 6, 2016 on Tokyo MX with the series also broadcast on Sun TV as well as streamed in NicoNico service in Japan.

The theme song of the series entitled  was performed by Seria Fukagawa, Aoi Koga, and Yūki Kuwahara, the three main cast. Hajime who also performs the theme song was responsible for the arrangement of the song and Jun'ichi Inoue was behind the composition.

Crunchyroll announced in July 2016 that it has acquired rights to stream the anime with stream dates and regional availability yet to be disclosed.

References

External links
  

2016 Japanese television series debuts
Magical girl anime and manga
Tokyo MX original programming